Kronovall Castle is a chateau in Tomelilla Municipality, Scania, Sweden. 
Today there is a hotel, restaurant, wine café and conference rooms operated on site.

History
In the early 17th century,  Danish councilor Anders Sinclair, sheriff at Landskrona, is mentioned as the owner of Kronovall. 

Kronovall was sold in 1668 to   Swedish nobleman Gustaf Persson Banér (1588–1644), Governor General of Scania.
The main building has two floors and was built in 1760. It was rebuilt in 1896 by Carl Gustaf Sparre in French Baroque style with tower-bearing wings, after drawings by Isak Gustaf Clason (1856–1930).

See also
List of castles in Sweden

References

External links
Kronovalls Vinslott website 

Buildings and structures in Skåne County